Fickett Hammock Preserve is a  park in northwest Hernando County, Florida. It is described as "undisturbed" and includes a walking trail. It is also used for birdwatching and is designated 'Environmentally Sensitive Land'.

References

Parks in Hernando County, Florida